Andrea Keller (born 1973) is an Australian pianist and composer. She won three ARIA Award for Best Jazz Album with Thirteen Sketches, Mikrokosmos and Footprints and was nominated in 2013 for the album Family Portraits.

Biography
Born to Czech parents in 1973, Keller grew up in Sydney, Australia.

Convinced from a young age that she would be a musician, she studied piano, flute and saxophone at Sydney's Conservatorium High School. Inspired by her older brother, she penned her first compositions at the age of 10, and received her Associate in Music diploma with distinction on piano at age 14. It was around this time that she was introduced to jazz music and the art of improvisation.

Continuing to explore classical, jazz and original musics throughout her teenage years, her musical path became more defined when she moved to Melbourne in 1993 to attend the Victorian College of the Arts (VCA).

Since 1996 Keller has been an active educator in Melbourne's tertiary jazz and improvisation departments, including the faculty of the VCA and Melbourne Conservatorium of Music, University of Melbourne, Monash University and Melbourne Polytechnic (formerly NMIT). In 1999, Keller founded the Andrea Keller Quintet, which later became the Andrea Keller Quartet. She also co-founded the Bennetts Lane Big Band.She plays piano for the Australian Art Orchestra. Keller wrote her doctoral thesis at the Sydney Conservatorium of Music about the Estonian composer Arvo Pärt.

Discography

Albums

Awards and nominations

AIR Awards
The Australian Independent Record Awards (commonly known informally as AIR Awards) is an annual awards night to recognise, promote and celebrate the success of Australia's Independent Music sector.

|-
| rowspan="2" | AIR Awards of 2014
|Wave Rider 
| Best Independent Jazz Album Artist
| 
|-

ARIA Music Awards
The ARIA Music Awards is an annual awards ceremony that recognises excellence, innovation, and achievement across all genres of the music of Australia.

! 
|-
| 2002
|Thirteen Sketches
| Best Jazz Album
| 
|rowspan="8"| 
|-
| 2003
|Mikrokosmos
| Best Jazz Album
| 
|-
| 2005
|Angels and Rascals 
| Best Jazz Album
| 
|-
| 2007
|Little Claps 
| Best Jazz Album
| 
|-
| 2008
|Footprints
| Best Jazz Album
| 
|-
| 2013
|Portraits 
| Best Jazz Album
| 
|-
| 2014
|Wave Rider 
| Best Jazz Album
| 
|-
| 2019
|Transients Vol. 1
| Best Jazz Album
| 
|-

Australian Jazz Bell Awards
The Australian Jazz Bell Awards, (also known as the Bell Awards or The Bells), are annual music awards for the jazz music genre in Australia. They commenced in 2003.

|-
| 2003
| Mikrokosmos – Andrea Keller
| Best Australian Contemporary Jazz Album
| 
|-
| 2008
| Little Claps – Andrea Keller Quartet
| Best Australian Contemporary Jazz Album
| 
|-
| 2012
| Andrea Keller Quartet
| Best Australian Jazz Ensemble
| 
|-
| 2014
| Wave Rider – Andrea Keller Quartet
| Best Australian Modern Jazz Album
| 
|-
| 2017
| Consider This – Andrea Keller and Tim Wilson Duo
| Best Australian Instrumental Jazz Album
| 
|-
| 2018
| Still Night: Music in Poetry – Andrea Keller
| Best Australian Jazz Vocal Album
| 
|-
| 2019
| Five Below Live – Andrea Keller
| Best Australian Jazz Ensemble of the Year
| 
|-

 Note wins only

Music Victoria Awards
The Music Victoria Awards, are an annual awards night celebrating Victorian music. They commenced in 2005. (awards 2005-2012 are unknown).

! 
|-
| 2013
|Family Portraits
| Best Jazz Album
| 
|rowspan="3"| 
|-
| 2014
|Wave Rider 
| Best Jazz Album
| 
|-
| 2019
| Transients Vol. 1
| Best Jazz Album
| 
|-
| 2020
| Life Is Brut[if]al
| Best Jazz Album
| 
| 
|-
|rowspan="3"| 2021
| herself
| Outstanding Woman in Music
| 
| 
|-
| herself
| Best Musician
| 
|rowspan="2"|
|-
| herself
| Best Jazz Act
|

References

External links
 

1973 births
Living people
Australian people of Czech descent
University of Melbourne alumni
Sydney Conservatorium of Music alumni
Academic staff of the University of Melbourne
ARIA Award winners
Australian jazz pianists
Australian classical pianists
21st-century classical pianists
Bennetts Lane Big Band members